Sarfarash (also Romanized as Sarfarāsh and Sar Farrāsh; also known as Sarfarāsh-e ‘Olyā) is a village in Mamulan Rural District, Mamulan District, Pol-e Dokhtar County, Lorestan Province, Iran. At the 2006 census, its population was 133, in 28 families.

References 

Towns and villages in Pol-e Dokhtar County